Ira Michael Heyman (May 30, 1930 – November 19, 2011) was a Professor of Law and of City and Regional Planning, and was Chancellor of University of California, Berkeley, and Secretary of the Smithsonian Institution.

Life
Heyman was born in 1930 in New York City. He graduated from the Bronx High School of Science, and in 1951 from Dartmouth College. At Dartmouth he joined the Theta Chi men's fraternity. After serving as a U.S. Marine Corps officer during the Korean War, he entered Yale Law School, where he became editor of the Yale Law Journal. Following his graduation in 1956, he served as a law clerk for Judge Charles Edward Clark of the U.S. Court of Appeals for the Second Circuit, and then from 1958 to 1959 he was a clerk for Chief Justice Earl Warren.

He joined the law faculty at Berkeley in 1959, and he became Vice Chancellor in 1974. He was named Berkeley's sixth Chancellor and served in that capacity from 1980 to 1990.

He returned to teaching law after leaving the Chancellorship. He was Counselor to the Secretary and Deputy Assistant Secretary for Policy at the U.S. Department of Interior, from 1993 to 1994; and Secretary of the Smithsonian Institution from 1994 to 2000. He served as a trustee of Dartmouth College from 1982 until 1992 and as the chair of the Board of Trustees for the last two years of his tenure. During his Berkeley years he became a member of the Bohemian Club, at which his closest associates included Caspar Weinberger, who was Ronald Reagan's Secretary of Defense.

After having smoked a few packages of cigarettes a day for many years, he died of emphysema in 2011.

Works
Report of the Ad Hoc Committee on Student Conduct (1964)
Women Students at Berkeley, views and data on possible sex discrimination in academic programs (1977)
Concern for the individual; the community YWCA and other Berkeley organizations (1978)
The Nobel Tradition at Berkeley, University of California, Berkeley (1984)
The Smithsonian Institution, 1994-1999:oral history transcript (2012)

See also 
 List of law clerks of the Supreme Court of the United States (Chief Justice)

References

External links
I. Michael Heyman from the Smithsonian Institution Archives
"Conversations with History:", Institute of International Studies, UC Berkeley
"Ira M Heyman", The Los Angeles Times
"Ira Michael Heyman, Former Secretary of the Smithsonian Institution, Dies at 81", Smithsonian Magazine'', November 22, 2011

1930 births
2011 deaths
UC Berkeley School of Law faculty
Law clerks of the Supreme Court of the United States
Lawyers from New York City
Leaders of the University of California, Berkeley
Secretaries of the Smithsonian Institution
Dartmouth College alumni
Yale Law School alumni
United States Marine Corps officers
United States Marine Corps personnel of the Korean War
Deaths from emphysema
20th-century American lawyers
Military personnel from California